Nawaka Rugby Club is a rugby club from the town of Nadi, Fiji.

The Nawaka Club has played at major European Sevens tournaments including those at Lisbon, Cascais and Madrid. They won the Melrose Sevens in 2000.

See also
Rugby Union in Fiji
Fiji Rugby Union
Fiji national rugby union team
Fiji national rugby sevens team
Colonial Cup

Fijian rugby union teams